Anna Maria "Anneke" van Giersbergen (born 8 March 1973) is a Dutch singer, songwriter and guitarist who became known worldwide as the lead singer for the rock band The Gathering between 1994 and 2007. She also has a solo career. The project was originally called Agua de Annique, but now goes by her own name.

A frequent collaborator of Arjen Anthony Lucassen, she portrayed main characters in the albums Into the Electric Castle, 01011001 and The Theater Equation by his project Ayreon. In 2014 they collaborated on a project called The Gentle Storm, which produced an album titled The Diary that was released in 2015. Since 2016 she has formed a new band VUUR with members of The Gentle Storm live band and her own solo band, to focus on the heavier side of her music. They released their debut album In This Moment We Are Free – Cities in October 2017.

Van Giersbergen has also prominently collaborated with Devin Townsend on many of his albums, Within Temptation, Anathema, Lawn, Farmer Boys, Napalm Death, Moonspell, Novembers Doom, Globus, Giant Squid, and many other artists and projects.

Biography

Early years 
Van Giersbergen was born in the small town of Sint-Michielsgestel, Netherlands. She began singing at age 7, when she participated in a music contest. At 12 years old she participated in her school choir where she studied and toured through France. Later, she took singing lessons and joined several bands. In 1992, she founded the duo "Bad Breath" with guitarist and singer Deniz Cagdas (Spencer Edgards), with music predominantly based on blues, jazz, folk and funk. She joined The Gathering in 1994, and is best known for her work with them.

The Gathering and several collaborations (1995–2006) 
In 1998, she sang on the Ayreon album Into the Electric Castle, a concept album telling the tale of an alien entity 'kidnapping' eight human souls from different times. Van Giersbergen portrayed an Egyptian woman from the time of the pharaohs.

In 2006, she appeared on the album 2006 Rubicon from Asia band members' John Wetton and Geoffrey Downes on the tracks "To Catch a Thief" and "Tears of Joy". She also appears on the Smear Campaign by the grindcore-death metal band Napalm Death, on the tracks "Weltschmerz" and "In Deference", contributing spoken rather than sung vocals "for good effect and relevance to the track".

In June 2006, the epic rock band Globus released the album Epicon, which included Van Giersbergen's vocal and writing contributions. Van Giersbergen co-wrote the lyrics for "Mighty Rivers Run", and sang lead vocal on the track as well as dueting with Christine Navarro on the seminal "Diem Ex Dei".

The Gathering departure, Agua de Annique and further collaborations (2007–2011) 

On 5 June 2007 it was announced that Van Giersbergen would be leaving The Gathering in August 2007 to focus on a new project, Agua de Annique, and to spend more time with her family. She released three albums under this name, Air in 2007 and both Pure Air and In Your Room in 2009. On 24 November 2007, she performed the song "Somewhere" with Within Temptation in Eindhoven. Her 7 February 2008 performance of "Somewhere" with Within Temptation at the Ahoy Arena in Rotterdam was featured in the Within Temptation live DVD Black Symphony.

Van Giersbergen also sings on the Ayreon album 01011001, released in early 2008. The character she portrays is one of the Forever, an alien being of the same race, who kidnapped her character from Into the Electric Castle.

She sings on "Scorpion Flower" from the album Night Eternal (2008) from Moonspell. On 3 December 2008, she performed this song live with Moonspell at the 013 in Tilburg, The Netherlands.

Van Giersbergen collaborated with Devin Townsend on his albums Addicted in 2009, Epicloud in 2012, Sky Blue in 2014, Transcendence in 2016, and Empath in 2019.
She also appeared as guest vocalist on several Devin Townsend Project live shows including the second show in the By a Thread concert series in 2011 and The Retinal Circus in 2012, both of which were released as DVD.

She appeared as a guest vocalist on the debut album of The Human Experimente, a project which also features Robert Fripp (King Crimson), John Wetton (Asia, King Crimson), Maynard James Keenan (Tool, A Perfect Circle, Puscifer), Adrian Belew, U-G-O with Sean Kingston, and Dann Pursey (Globus, Vantan).

In 2011, Van Giersbergen collaborated with Yoav Goren on the song "The Promise", the lead track on Globus second album Break From This World. She co-wrote lyrics and, along with Lisbeth Scott, was a featured vocalist on the track. She performed the track "What Could Have Been" for death-doom metal band Novembers Doom. Van Giersbergen also features on a track in the orchestral re-interpretations album from English progressive rock band Anathema, Falling Deeper, released on 5 September 2011. She toured with the band in South America, singing "Everwake" during concerts.

Solo career, The Gentle Storm and VUUR (2012–present) 
Van Giersbergen released a solo album, Everything Is Changing, in 2012, followed by Drive in 2013.

On 22 April 2014, Arjen Anthony Lucassen revealed that his next project would be a collaboration with Van Giersbergen, their third work together after the Ayreon albums Into the Electric Castle and 01011001. He described it as "an epic double concept album, a combination of 'classical meets metal' and 'acoustic folk'." The project is named The Gentle Storm, with their first album released in 2015.

Later in 2015, Van Giersbergen collaborated again with Lucassen, portraying the character of Fear in the musical The Theater Equation, consisting of three shows of a semi-staged version of the Ayreon album The Human Equation (Mikael Åkerfeldt originally recorded the vocals for Fear on the album).

In February 2016, she released a collaboration album with the Icelandic band Árstíðir called Verloren Verleden.

On 1 December 2016, she announced the creation of her new band, named VUUR, with musicians coming mostly from The Gentle Storm live band. Their debut album was released in 2017.

In September 2017, she was a performer in the 'Ayreon Universe' concert series at 013 in Tilburg.

In 2018 she performed on "Amongst Stars" from Finnish Heavy Metal band Amorphis' album Queen of Time, including appearing on the official music video. She also performed in two concerts alongside Residentie Orkest The Hague covering songs from Van Giersbergen's whole career, later released in the live album Symphonized in October.

In 2019, she toured the Netherlands on an acoustic theatre tour 'Inchecken', performing a career-spanning setlist alongside VUUR bandmate Ferry Duijsens in over 40 Dutch theatres, touring from January to March.
She also joined Amorphis and Delain for their 2019 North American tour, performing a solo setlist as well as performing "Amongst Stars" alongside Amorphis during their set. On 16 November, she announced a solo album titled The Darkest Skies Are the Brightest, set for release on 26 February 2021.

Musical roots and influences 
Van Giersbergen's musical roots are in classical and jazz music, but she enjoys rock and pop the most. Some of her main influences are Prince, Ella Fitzgerald and Thom Yorke (Radiohead).

Personal life 
On 20 February 2005 she gave birth to a son named Finn, whom she had with her husband Rob Snijders.

She is not related to Dutch singer Dianne van Giersbergen.

Backing band 
 Rob Snijders – drums
 Annelies Kuijsters – keyboards
 Joost van Haaren – bass
 Ferry Duijsens – guitars
 Gijs Coolen – guitars

Discography

Albums 
 Everything Is Changing (2012)
 Drive (2013)
Symphonized – with Residentie Orkest The Hague (2018)
The Darkest Skies Are the Brightest (2021)

Singles 
 Feel Alive (2011)
 Circles (2011)
 Drive (2013)

Filmography 
 Soaring Highs and Brutal Lows: The Voices of Women in Metal (2015)

References

External links 

 AnnekevanGiersbergen.com – official website
 Agua de Annique official website

1973 births
Living people
Dutch women singers
Dutch heavy metal singers
Dutch rock guitarists
Dutch rock pianists
Dutch rock singers
Dutch sopranos
Women guitarists
Women heavy metal singers
English-language singers from the Netherlands
People from Sint-Michielsgestel
Globus (music)
Inside Out Music artists